Procambarus cavernicola, the Gabriel cave crayfish, is a freshwater crayfish endemic to Oaxaca in Mexico. It is a cave-dwelling species known from only one cave, Gabriel Cave in the Mojarra Hill, near Buenos Aires.

References

Cambaridae
Cave crayfish
Freshwater crustaceans of North America
Crustaceans described in 2003
Endemic fauna of Mexico